Charles Edwards (1825 – 22 February 1889) was a British Liberal Party politician.

Edwards inherited the Dolserau Hall estate in 1858. He was a Justice of the peace of Merionethshire, and the High Sheriff in 1871.

Political career 
Edwards was elected MP for Windsor at a by-election in 1866—caused by Henry Hoare and Henry Labouchère being unseated when the 1865 general election was declared void on petition, due to bribery via election agents—and held the seat until 1868 when he did not seek re-election.

In 1879, he stood as the Liberal Party candidate in the 1879 Canterbury by-election. He lost narrowly to the Conservative candidate. After the election, it emerged that Edwards had spent about £140 on buying votes during the campaign. Although Edwards disclaimed knowledge of this and blamed his campaign manager, he did admit that the money was spent on bribery and he had personally repaid the amount to his manager.

In 1880, he stood again in Canterbury in the general election, and again narrowly lost the seat.

References

External links
 

Liberal Party (UK) MPs for English constituencies
Members of the Parliament of the United Kingdom for constituencies in Berkshire
UK MPs 1865–1868
1825 births
1889 deaths